The Ultimate Fighter: Team McGregor vs. Team Chandler (also known as The Ultimate Fighter 31 and TUF 31) is a 2023 installment of the Ultimate Fighting Championship (UFC)-produced reality television series The Ultimate Fighter on ESPN+. Former UFC Featherweight and Lightweight Champion Conor McGregor and former three-time Bellator Lightweight World Champion Michael Chandler (also former lightweight title challenger) will serve as head coaches for the season.

This season will feature male bantamweights and lightweights. Filming began in February in Las Vegas and the show will debut on May 30. The cast was officially announced on March 4, featuring 8 former UFC fighters (including The Ultimate Fighter: Undefeated featherweight winner Brad Katona) and 8 promotional newcomers.

Cast

Coaches

  Team McGregor:
 Conor McGregor, Head Coach
 John Kavanagh, Assistant Coach
 Owen Roddy, Jiu Jitsu Coach

  Team Chandler:
 Michael Chandler, Head Coach
 Ryan Bader, Assistant Coach
 Robert Drysdale, Jiu Jitsu Coach
 Jason Strout, Striking Coach
 Greg Jones, Wrestling Coach

Fighters
Bantamweights: Hunter Azure, Rico DiSciullo, Cody Gibson, Mando Gutierrez, Brad Katona, Timur Valiev, Carlos Vera and Trevor Wells.
Lightweights: Lee Hammond, Kurt Holobaugh, Austin Hubbard, Nate Jennerman, Jason Knight, Aaron McKenzie, Landon Quinones and Roosevelt Roberts.

See also 
 List of UFC events
 2023 in UFC
 List of current UFC fighters

References 

The Ultimate Fighter episodes
2020s American reality television series
2023 in mixed martial arts
Sports competitions in Las Vegas